Saint Patrick's Roman Catholic Church (also known as Methodist Episcopal Church, South) is a historic church building at 330 Monmouth Street in Independence, Oregon.

It was built in 1874 and added to the National Register in 1987.

See also
National Register of Historic Places listings in Polk County, Oregon
Independence Historic District

References

Roman Catholic Archdiocese of Portland in Oregon
Former Roman Catholic church buildings in Oregon
Independence, Oregon
Roman Catholic churches completed in 1874
Buildings and structures in Polk County, Oregon
Churches on the National Register of Historic Places in Oregon
1874 establishments in Oregon
Individually listed contributing properties to historic districts on the National Register in Oregon
National Register of Historic Places in Polk County, Oregon
19th-century Roman Catholic church buildings in the United States